Kharam  is a Southern Naga language of India. Peterson (2017) classifies the closely related Purum language (and hence Kharam as well) as part of the Northwestern branch of Kuki-Chin. According Ethnologue, Kharam shares a high degree of mutual intelligibility with Purum.

Geographical distribution
Kharam Naga is spoken in the following locations of Manipur (Ethnologue).
Senapati district: Purumlikli, Purumkhulen, Purumkhunou, Waicheiphai, and Moibunglikli villages
Chandel district: Lamlang Huipi, Chandanpokpi, Khongkhang Chothe, Loirang Talsi, Salemthar, Zat’lang, and New Wangparan villages

References

Languages of Manipur
Endangered languages of India
Southern Naga languages